Mosque No. 25 is a former Nation of Islam (NOI) mosque in Newark, New Jersey, which was presided by Minister Louis Farrakhan (Louis X) and James Russell McGregor (James 3X).

History 
Located at 257 South Orange Avenue in Newark, the building was originally built for Victorian Theatre, a vaudeville theater. It was later known as Congress Theater.

In 1958, Temple No. 25 was the first Nation of Islam mosque to open in Newark, New Jersey. Located on South Orange Avenue, its membership had a reputation of being more active and loyal than NOI members in other larger municipalities.

When Malcolm X returned from his trip to Africa in September 1959, he showed home movies to the members at this mosque. Men involved in Malcolm X's assassination had ties with the mosque, including the 3 men convicted of his murder and two additional accomplices that were not charged. On September 7, 1973, the mosque was the location of the funeral for James Russell McGregor (James Shabazz). Over 3,000 people were in attendance.

It is now known as Masjid Imam Ali K. Muslim.

References

Buildings and structures in Newark, New Jersey
Former Nation of Islam mosques
20th-century mosques
Islam in New Jersey
Louis Farrakhan
African-American history in Newark, New Jersey